is a passenger railway station in the city of Yachimata, Chiba Japan, operated by the East Japan Railway Company (JR East).

Lines

Layout
The station consists of a single side platform and an island platform connected by a footbridge. The station as a Midori no Madoguchi staffed ticket office.

Platforms

History
Yachimata Station was opened on May 1, 1897 as a station on the Sōbu Railway for both passenger and freight operations. On September 1, 1907, the Sōbu Railway was nationalised, becoming part of the Japanese Government Railway (JGR).  The Chiba Prefectural Railways Yachimata Line began operations on May 18, 1914, and was discontinued on May 14, 1940. A new station building was completed in 1926. After World War II, the JGR became the Japan National Railways (JNR). Scheduled freight operations were suspended from November 15, 1982. A new station building was completed in July 1984. The station was absorbed into the JR East network upon the privatization of the Japan National Railways (JNR) on April 1, 1987. Express services began operations from March 16, 1991. A new station building was completed in April 2004.

Passenger statistics
In fiscal 2019, the station was used by an average of 5563 passengers daily (boarding passengers only).

Surrounding area
 Yachimata City Office
 Yachimata Middle School

See also
 List of railway stations in Japan

References

External links

  JR East station information 

Railway stations in Japan opened in 1897
Railway stations in Chiba Prefecture
Sōbu Main Line
Yachimata